Barbara Luddy (May 25, 1908 – April 1, 1979) was an American actress best known for her voiceover work for Walt Disney Studios in the 1950s and 1970s.

Biography
Born in Great Falls, Montana, Luddy was the daughter of Will and Molly Luddy of Helena, Montana. She sang in vaudeville as a child. She attended Ursuline Convent in Great Falls, Montana.

Career

Stage
In 1929, Luddy toured with Leo Carrillo in Australia as part of a touring company that presented the play Lombardi, Ltd. A review in the Sydney Morning Herald cited Luddy's work portraying a mannequin as "a role in which Miss Barbara Luddy made a great hit by her pert audacity and vivaciousness."

Radio
Luddy was a member of the dramatic cast of the Chicago Theater of the Air. One of Luddy's better known roles on radio was being a regular performer on The First Nighter Program from 1936 until the series ended in 1953. In 1937, she and fellow First Nighter actor Les Tremayne set what a contemporary newspaper article called "a precedent ... when these signed long term contracts calling for their exclusive services" on the program."

She also played Veronica Gunn in the comedy Great Gunns. In soap operas, she played Judith Clark in Lonely Women Carol Evans Martin in The Road of Life, and Janet Munson in Woman in White.

Film
Luddy's film career began with silent pictures in the late 1920s. She is perhaps best remembered for her voice work in Disney animated films such as Lady and the Tramp (in which she played the titular Lady), Sleeping Beauty, One Hundred and One Dalmatians, Robin Hood and the Winnie-the-Pooh featurettes including Winnie the Pooh and the Honey Tree, Winnie the Pooh and the Blustery Day, and Winnie the Pooh and Tigger Too, all of which were edited into the composite feature The Many Adventures of Winnie the Pooh.
Her other film credits include Terrified (1962) and the TV film Lost Flight (1969).

Television
Luddy guest starred in episodes of such television programs as Hazel, Dragnet, Adam-12, and Kolchak: The Night Stalker.

Personal life
Luddy married R. Ned LeFevre, an actor and announcer, on September 18, 1942. The couple had one daughter, Barbara (1949-2013) and a son, Chris LeFevre, who preceded Barbara in death.

Luddy died of lung cancer in Los Angeles, California, in 1979, at age 70.

Filmography

References

External links

1908 births
1979 deaths
Actresses from Montana
American radio actresses
American silent film actresses
People from Great Falls, Montana
Deaths from lung cancer in California
20th-century American actresses
Disney people